This list of botanical gardens and arboretums in Missouri is intended to include all significant botanical gardens and arboretums in the U.S. state of Missouri

See also
List of botanical gardens and arboretums in the United States

References 

 
Arboreta in Missouri
botanical gardens and arboretums in Missouri